Khaled Fairouz  is a Kuwait football forward who played for Kuwait in the 1996 Asian Cup. He also played for Yarmook

External links

Kuwaiti footballers
Year of birth missing (living people)
Living people
Association football forwards
Kuwait international footballers
1996 AFC Asian Cup players
Kuwait Premier League players
Al-Yarmouk SC (Kuwait) players